Peter Schneider (born 4 April 1991) is an Austrian professional ice hockey right wing currently playing for EC Red Bull Salzburg in the ICE Hockey League (ICEHL).

Playing career
Undrafted, Schneider previously played with the Vienna Capitals of the Austrian Hockey League after spending the first three seasons of his professional career in the ECHL.

On May 2, 2019, Schneider left the Capitals and the EBEL after a dominant season, securing a one-year contract with Swiss NL club, EHC Biel.

Awards and honours

References

External links

1991 births
Living people
Austrian ice hockey right wingers
Florida Everblades players
Indiana Ice players
Indy Fuel players
Kalamazoo Wings (ECHL) players
HC Kometa Brno players
Notre Dame Fighting Irish men's ice hockey players
Vienna Capitals players
People from Klosterneuburg
EC Red Bull Salzburg players
Sportspeople from Lower Austria
Austrian expatriate ice hockey people
Austrian expatriate sportspeople in the Czech Republic
Austrian expatriate sportspeople in Slovakia
Austrian expatriate sportspeople in the United States
Austrian expatriate sportspeople in Switzerland
Expatriate ice hockey players in  the Czech Republic
Expatriate ice hockey players in Slovakia
Expatriate ice hockey players in the United States
Expatriate ice hockey players in Switzerland
EHC Biel players